London Voices is a London-based choral ensemble founded by Terry Edwards (1939-2022) in 1973. In its early years, it also incorporated the London Opera Chorus and London Sinfonietta Voices and Chorus. In 2004, Ben Parry, became co-director of the ensemble and in 2021 the Director and manager. Ben is currently artistic director of the National Youth Choirs of Great Britain, and was formerly assistant director of Music at King's College, Cambridge.  London Voices has been involved in many performances, recordings of operas and CD and film soundtracks, including The Hobbit, Hunger Games, the prequel trilogy of Star Wars, The Lord of the Rings and Harry Potter series, The Iron Lady, Enemy at the Gates, La traviata, and The Passion of the Christ.  They have recorded with such diverse artists as Luciano Pavarotti, Dave Brubeck, Sir Paul McCartney, Queen,  Deaf Havana, Sting, Renée Fleming, Bryn Terfel and Roger Waters and have performed in concert venues all over the world, including London, Aldeburgh, Birmingham, Paris, New York, Shanghai, Jordan and Lucerne.

Discography and Films

Selected film and/or other media soundtracks featuring London Voices:
(for a full list of recordings see here)
2022 Puss in Boots: The Last Wish (Pereira, Heitor)
2022 Guillermo del Toro's Pinocchio (Desplat, Alexandre)
2022 Werewolf by Night (Giacchino, Michael)
2022 Thor: Love and Thunder (Giacchino, Michael - Melumad, Nami)
 2022 Jurassic World: Dominion (Giacchino, Michael)
2022 Fantastic Beasts: The Secrets of Dumbledore (Howard, James Newton)
2021 Don't Look Up (Britell, Nicholas)
2021 No Time To Die (Zimmer, Hans)
2021 The Suicide Squad (Murphy, John)
2021 Raya and the Last Dragon (Howard, James Newton)
2020 Trolls: World Tour (Shapiro, Theodore)
2019 Godzilla: King of the Monsters (McCreary, Bear)
2019 Avengers: Endgame (Silvestri, Alan)
2018 Aquaman (Gregson-Williams, Rupert)
2018 Fantastic Beasts: The Crimes of Grindelwald (Howard, James Newton)
2018 Jurassic World: Fallen Kingdom (Giacchino, Michael)
2018 Avengers: Infinity War (Silvestri, Alan)
2017 Wonder Woman (Gregson-Williams, Rupert)
2017 Thor: Ragnarok (Mothersbaugh, Mark)
2016 Fantastic Beasts and Where to Find Them (Howard, James Newton)
2016 Doctor Strange  (Giacchino, Michael)
2015 Spectre (Newman, Thomas)
2014 The Hobbit: The Battle of the Five Armies	(Shore, Howard)
2014 Exodus: Gods and Kings	(Iglesias, Alberto)
2014 Maleficent	(Howard, James Newton)	
2014 The Grand Budapest Hotel	(Desplat, Alexandre)	
2013 Escape from Planet Earth	(Zigman, Aaron)	
2013 Hunger Games: Catching Fire	(Howard, James Newton)	
2013 The Hobbit: The Desolation Of Smaug	(Shore, Howard)	
2013 Byzantium	(Navaratte, Javier)	
2012 Rise of the Guardians	(Desplat, Alexandre)	
2012 Snow White and the Huntsman	(Howard, James Newton)	
2012 The Hobbit: An Unexpected Journey	(Shore, Howard)	
2012 The Hunger Games	(Howard, James Newton)	
2012 The Pirates! Band of Misfits	(Shapiro, Theodore)	
2011 Harry Potter and the Deathly Hallows: Part 2	(Desplat, Alexandre)	
2011 Immortals	(Morris, Trevor)	
2011 Green Lantern (Howard, James Newton)	
2011 The Iron Lady	(Newman, Thomas)	
2010 Harry Potter and the Deathly Hallows: Part 1	(Desplat, Alexandre)	
2010 Iron Man 2	(Debney, John)	
2009 A Christmas Carol	(Silvestri, Alan)
2009 Harry Potter and the Half-Blood Prince     (Hooper, Nicholas)	
2008 Inkheart	(Navarrete, Javier)	
2008 Kung Fu Panda	(Powell, John)	
2007 The Golden Compass	(Desplat, Alexandre)
2007 Harry Potter and the Order of the Phoenix     (Hooper, Nicholas)
2005 Star Wars Episode III - Revenge of the Sith	(Williams, John)
2004 Harry Potter and the Prisoner of Azkaban	(Williams, John)
2004 The Passion of the Christ	(Debney, John)
2003 Lord of the Rings: Return of the King	(Shore, Howard)
2002 Harry Potter and the Chamber of Secrets	(Williams, John)
2002 Lord of the Rings: The Two Towers (Shore, Howard)
2002 Star Wars Episode II - Attack of the Clones	(Williams, John) 	
2001 Harry Potter and the Philosopher's Stone	(Williams, John)
2001 Lord of the Rings: The Fellowship of the Ring	(Shore, Howard)	
2001 The Rat Race	(Powell, John)	
2000 Enemy at the Gates	(Horner, James)	
1999 Dogma	(Shore, Howard)	
1999 Star Wars Episode I - The Phantom Menace	(Williams, John)	
1999 Topsy Turvy	(Gilbert & Sullivan) 	
1997 Looking for Richard	(Shore, Howard)	
1995 Judge Dredd	(Silvestri, Alan)	
1995 Cut Throat Island	(Debney, John)	
1994 Immortal Beloved	(Beethoven, L.V.)	
1991 An American Tail	(Horner, James)	
1989 The Cook, the Thief etc.	(Nyman, Michael)	
1986 The Mission	(Morricone, Ennio)	

Selected recordings by London Voices:
(for a full list of recordings see here)

Renée Fleming - I Want Magic! James Levine (1998) Decca 460567
Igor Stravinsky - Vol. XI:  Violin Concerto/Ebony Concerto/The Flood Robert Craft (1998)  Music Masters 67195
Angela Gheorghiu & Roberto Alagna - Verdi per due Claudio Abbado EMI 56656
Vanessa-Mae - Storm (1998) EMI 21800
Gaetano Donizetti - Lucia di Lammermoor Charles Mackerras (1998) Sony 63174
All That Jazz: The Best of Ute Lemper (1998) Decca 458931
Michael Nyman and Damon Albarn - Ravenous (1999) Virgin 47126/EMI 22370
Giacomo Puccini - Il Trittico Antonio Pappano (1999) EMI 56587
György Ligeti - Le Grand Macabre (1999) Esa-Pekka Salonen EMI 55563
Leonard Bernstein - Wonderful Town (1999 Studio Cast Album) Simon Rattle EMI 56753
Felix Mendelssohn, Giuseppe Verdi - A Midsummer Night's Dream (1999) Decca 466098
Tan Dun - 2000 Today (1999) Sony 61529
Nigel Kennedy - Classic Kennedy Barry Wordsworth (2000) EMI 90407
Lesley Garrett - Lesley Garrett (2000) BBC 51338
Lesley Garrett - I Will Wait for You Michel Legrand, John Harle, Peter Robinson (2000) BBC 75605
Leonard Bernstein - White House Cantata Kent Nagano (2000) DG 463448
Renée Fleming - Renée Fleming  Charles Mackerras Decca 467049
Béla Bartók -  The Miraculous Mandarin Neeme Järvi (2000) Chandos 9029
Charles Ives - When the Moon Richard Bernas (2000) Decca 466841
Georg Solti - United Nations 50th Anniversary Concert (Fidelio Act II Finale) Decca 448901
Sofia Gubaydulina -  Canticle of the Sun  Mstislav Rostropovich (2001) EMI 57313
Britten-Messiaen Choral Works (2001) Edwards  Virgin 61916
Angela Gheorghiu - Casta Diva Evelino Pidò (2001) EMI 571632
Robert Alagna - French Arias Bertrand de Billy (2001) EMI 57012
Elliot Goldenthal - Final Fantasy: The Spirits Within (2001) Sony 89697
John Adams - El Niño  Kent Nagano (2001) Nonesuch 79634
Amy Grant - The Spirit of Christmas (2001) Hallmark 2001
Roberto Alagna - Bel Canto Evelino Pidò (2001)   EMI 57302
Lesley Garrett - The Singer (2001) EMI 57403
Ben Heppner - Airs Francais   Myung-whun Chung (2001) DG 471372
Benjamin Britten - Curlew River  Neville Marriner (2001) Phillips 454469
Salvadore Licitra - The Debut: E Lucevan le stelle Carlo Rizzi Sony 089923
Denise Leigh, Jane Gilchrist - Operatunity Winners Paul Daniel EMI 57594
Bryn Terfel - Bryn Terfel Sings Favourites   Barry Wordsworth (2002)DG 474438
Giuseppe Verdi - Il Trovatore Antonio Pappano (2002) EMI 57360
Leoš Janáček - Jenůfa Bernard Haitink (2002) Erato 45330
Queen - The Queen Symphony Tolga Kashif (2003) EMI
Dave Brubeck  Classical Brubeck  Russell Gloyd (2003) Telarc 80621
Roberto Alagna - Nessun Dorma  Mark Elder (2003)  EMI 57627
György Ligeti - The Ligeti Project IV: Hamburg Concerto/Double Concerto/Ramifications /The Requiem Jonathon Nott (2003) Teldec 88263
Alain Amouyal - Frames for a Fairy Tale (2003) Adams  Plateforme P2000
Violaine Corradi - Cirque du Soleil: Varekai (2004) BMG 74321
Luciano Berio - Sinfonia Peter Eötvös(2005) DG 4775380
Paul McCartney - Ecce Cor Meum (2006) EMI 70424
Jon Hopkins - Singularity (2018) Domino Records
Coldplay - Everyday Life (2019) Parlophone
Ozzy Osbourne - Ordinary Man (2020) Epic Records

References

External links
 Official site

London choirs
Musical groups established in 1973
Sony Classical Records artists